The Church of Jesus Christ of Latter-day Saints in New York refers to the Church of Jesus Christ of Latter-day Saints (LDS Church) and its members in New York. New York was the boyhood home of Joseph Smith. Much of early LDS Church history of the now worldwide church is centered in upstate New York. The LDS Church was organized on April 6, 1830 in Fayette, New York under the name of Church of Christ.

Official church membership as a percentage of general population was 0.41% in 2014. According to the 2014 Pew Forum on Religion & Public Life survey, less than 1% of New Yorkers self-identify themselves most closely with the LDS Church. The LDS Church is the 13th largest denomination in New York.

History

The early history of the LDS Church is deeply rooted in the state of New York with pivotal moments taking place in upstate New York and New York City. Joseph Smith claimed that while praying in a wooded area near his home in Palmyra in 1820, God and Jesus Christ, in a vision, appeared to him and set in motion the eventual establishment of a new religion.

According to his later accounts, Smith was visited by an angel named Moroni, while praying one night in 1823. Smith said that this angel revealed the location of a buried book made of golden plates that would be translated into the Book of Mormon.

The completed work was published in Palmyra on March 26, 1830, by printer E. B. Grandin. Soon after, on April 6, 1830, Smith and his followers formally organized the Church of Christ, and small branches were established in Palmyra, Fayette, and Colesville, New York. The Book of Mormon brought Smith regional notoriety and opposition from those who remembered the 1826 Chenango County trial.

In July 1840, the first group of new converts from Liverpool, England, arrived on the Britannia ship in the New York harbor.

On April 6, 2000, 170 years after the Church was organized, the Palmyra New York Temple was dedicated. The temple overlooks the Sacred Grove and other historic sites. The first temple in New York City, the Manhattan New York Temple, was dedicated on 13 June 2004.

Stakes

As of February 2023, New York was home to the following stakes:

Missions

New York New York Mission, originally known as the Eastern States, was organized on May 6, 1839. It was discontinued in 1850, 1858 and 1869, then reopened in 1854, 1865 and 1893 respectively. On June 20, 1974, it ras renamed the New York New York Mission, and then renamed New York New York South Mission on July 1, 1993, when the New York New York North Mission Was Created.
The Cumorah Mission was renamed the New York Rochester Mission on June 20, 1974.

Temples
New York currently has two temples.

Harrison New York

The Harrison New York Temple, previously known as the White Plains New York Temple, was a planned temple of the Church of Jesus Christ of Latter-day Saints (LDS Church) that was to be constructed in Harrison, New York. Construction of the temple was to take place on a 24-acre site purchased by the LDS Church at the intersection of Interstate 287 and Hutchinon River Parkway. Reportedly, efforts had been underway until 2004, but construction was never started and eventually suspended.  After delays by lawsuits and objections by local officials, this temple was removed from the list on the LDS Church's official temple website soon after the dedication of the Manhattan New York Temple.

See also
The Church of Jesus Christ of Latter-day Saints membership statistics (United States)

References

Further reading

External links
 New York Historic Sites Official site
 ComeUntoChrist.org Latter-day Saints Visitor site
 The Church of Jesus Christ of Latter-day Saints Official site

Latter Day Saint movement in New York (state)
New York